Siam University (SU, Thai: มหาวิทยาลัยสยาม) is a university located on Phet Kasem Road in Phasi Charoen District, Bangkok. Siam University was founded by the late Narong Mongkhonvanit as a three-year private engineering school in 1965.

In 1973, Siam University, then known as Siam Technical College, was formally established as a higher education institution with authorization to grant degrees. Later in 1986, Siam Technical College became Siam Technical University, a full-fledged private, non-profit university. Three years later, the name was changed again to Siam University to reflect the diversity in the fields of study offered.

In 1995, the international college was established. Currently, over 400 international students from more than 15 countries are enrolled in the international college of Siam University.

The governing body of Siam University is the university council led by Kasem Wattanachai, councilor of the Privy Council of Thailand.

Siam University International MBA program

Siam University provides Master of Business Administration in both Thai and English language.

Siam University School of Medicine 
The Faculty of Medicine, Siam University is the second private medical school in Thailand. It was established in 2013 by a group of physicians, with the aim of increasing the number of doctors in Thailand, particularly in rural areas where the number of medical doctors is deficient.  It has been assessed on quality by the Medical Council of Thailand in 2013 and started the first semester in August 2013.

International College
The curriculum was approved by the Office of Higher Education Commission of Thailand.  Students are required to complete general education courses (languages, computer applications) and business administration courses (accounting, finance, marketing, organization management, human resources), but choose their own specialty based on international business or hotel & tourism majors. Bongkosh Rittichainuwat serves as the Dean of International College.

References

External links
 Siam University Official Website

Siam University
Private universities and colleges in Thailand
Educational institutions established in 1965
1965 establishments in Thailand